Bujkovci is a village in the Ilinden Municipality of North Macedonia.

Demographics
According to the 2002 census, the village had a total of 946 inhabitants. Ethnic groups in the village include:

Macedonians 641
Serbs 5
Romani 295
Others 5

References

Villages in Ilinden Municipality